In astronomy, an open cluster remnant (OCR) is the final stage in the evolution of an open star cluster.

Theory 

Viktor Ambartsumian (1938) and Lyman Spitzer (1940) showed that, from a theoretical point of view, it was impossible for a star cluster to evaporate completely; furthermore, Spitzer pointed out two possible final results for the evolution of a star cluster: evaporation provokes physical collisions between stars, or evaporation proceeds until a stable binary or higher multiplicity system is produced.

Observations 

Using objective-prism plates, Lodén (1987, 1988, 1993) has investigated the possible population of open cluster remnants in our Galaxy under the assumption that the stars in these clusters should have similar luminosity and spectral type. He found that about 30% of the objects in his sample could be catalogued as a possible type of cluster remnant. The membership for these objects is ≥ 15. The typical age of these systems is about 150 Myr with a range of 50-200 Myr. They show a significant density of binaries and a large number of optical binaries. The stars of these OCRs have a trend to be massive and hence early-type (A-F) stars although this observational method includes a noticeable selection effect because bright early-type spectra are easier to detect than fainter and later ones. In fact, almost no stars with spectral type later than F appear among his objects. On the other hand, his results were not fully conclusive because there are known regions in the sky with many stars of the same spectral type but in which it is difficult to find two stars with the same proper motions or radial velocity. A striking example of this fact is Upgren 1; initially, it was suggested that this small group of seven F stars was the remnant of an old cluster (Upgren & Rubin 1965) but later, Gatewood et al. (1988) concluded that Upgren 1 is only a chance alignment of F stars resulting from the close passage of members of two dynamically different sets of stars. Very recently, Stefanik et al. (1997) have shown that one of the sets is formed by 5 stars including a long-period binary and an unusual triple system.

Simulations 

Regarding numerical simulations, for systems with some 25 to 250 stars, von Hoerner (1960, 1963), Aarseth (1968) and van Albada (1968) suggested that the final outcome of the evolution of an open cluster is one or more tightly bound binaries (or even a hierarchical triple system). Van Albada pointed out several observational candidates (σ Ori, ADS 12696, ρ Oph, 1 Cas, 8 Lac and 67 Oph) as being OCRs and Wielen (1975) indicated another one, the Ursa Major moving group (Collinder 285).

References 

 Aarseth, S. J.; 1968, Bull. Astron. Ser., 3, 3, 105
 van Albada, T. S.; 1968, Bull. Astron. Inst. Neth., 19, 479
 Ambartsumian, V. A.; 1938, Ann. Len. State Univ., # 22, 4, 19 (English translation in: Dynamics of Star Clusters,   eds. J. Goodman, P. Hut, (Dordrecht: Reidel) p. 521)
 Gatewood, G.; De Jonge, J. K.; Castelaz, M.; et al., 1988, ApJ, 332, 917
 von Hoerner, S.; 1960, Z. Astrophys., 50, 184
 von Hoerner, S.; 1963, Z. Astrophys., 57, 47
 Lodén, L. O.; 1987, Ir. Astron. J., 18, 95
 Lodén, L. O.; 1988, A&SS, 142, 177
 Lodén, L. O.; 1993, A&SS, 199, 165
 Spitzer, L.; 1940, MNRAS, 100, 397
 Stefanik, R. P.; Caruso, J. R.; Torres, G.; Jha, S.; Latham, D. W.; 1997, Baltic Astronomy, 6, 137
 Upgren, A. R.; Rubin V. C.; 1965, PASP, 77, 355
 Wielen, R.; 1975, in: Dynamics of Stellar Systems, ed. A. Hayli, (Dordrecht: Reidel) p. 97

Further reading
 Bica, E.; Santiago, B. X.; Dutra, C. M.; Dottori, H.; de Oliveira, M. R.; Pavani D., 2001, A&A, 366, 827-833 
 Carraro, G.; 2002, A&A, 385, 471-478  
 Carraro, G.; de la Fuente Marcos, Raúl; Villanova, S.; Moni Bidin, C.; de la Fuente Marcos, Carlos; Baumgardt, H.; Solivella, G.; 2007, A&A, 466, 931-941 
 Carraro, G.; 2006, Bulletin of the Astronomical Society of India, 34, 153-162  
 de la Fuente Marcos, Raúl; 1998, A&A, 333, L27-L30 
 de la Fuente Marcos, Raúl; de la Fuente Marcos, Carlos; Moni Bidin, C.; Carraro, G.; Costa, E.; 2013, MNRAS, 434, 194-208 
 Kouwenhoven, M. B. N.; Goodwin, S. P.; Parker, R. J.; Davies, M. B.; Malmberg, D.; Kroupa, P.; 2010, MNRAS, 404, 1835-1848 
 Moni Bidin, C.; de la Fuente Marcos, Raúl; de la Fuente Marcos, Carlos; Carraro, G.; 2010, A&A, 510, A44 
 Pavani, D. B.; Bica, E.; 2007, A&A, 468, 139-150 
 Pavani, D. B.; Bica, E.; Ahumada, A. V.; Clariá, J. J.; 2003, A&A, 399, 113-120 
 Pavani, D. B.; Bica, E.; Dutra, C. M.; Dottori, H.; Santiago, B. X.; Carranza, G.; Díaz, R. J.; 2001, A&A, 374, 554-563 
 Pavani, D. B.; Kerber, L. O.; Bica, E.; Maciel, W. J.; 2011, MNRAS, 412, 1611-1626 
 Villanova, S., Carraro, G.; de la Fuente Marcos, Raúl; Stagni, R.; 2004, A&A, 428, 67-77 

Star clusters
Remmant
Stellar evolution